Games to Play is a book written by Robert Charles Bell.

Contents
Games to Play is a book which displays many of the finest games in the author's collection in 200 large pages illustrated in full color.

Reception
David Pritchard reviewed Games to Play for Games International magazine and stated that "A minor classic and a must-buy, I would hazard, for every dedicated games player. Compared to the average boxed game around offered at the same price, Games to Play has to be a bargain, and the idea Christmas present."

References

Books about games